= Korea Information Society Development Institute =

South Korean research institute

The Korea Information Society Development Institute (KISDI, Korean: 정보통신정책연구원) is a specialized research institute in information and communication technology (ICT) and broadcasting in South Korea. It is affiliated with the National Research Council for Economics, Humanities, and Social Sciences, under the jurisdiction of the Prime Minister's Office (Office for Government Policy Coordination).

KISDI aims to pursue public interest through the advancement of ICT and broadcasting, aspiring to become the leading platform for experts in these fields. Established on February 4, 1985, as the Telecommunications Policy Research Center, KISDI is located at 18 Jeongtong-ro, Deoksan-eup, Jincheon-gun, Chungcheongbuk-do.

== Purpose ==
KISDI collects, investigates, researches, and disseminates information on domestic and international informatization, ICT, and broadcasting policies, systems, and industries. By doing so, it contributes to the establishment of national ICT policies and the enhancement of the national economy in the knowledge-based information society.

- Conducts policy research on intelligent informatization to foster digital economic and social development.
- Develops policies to advance ICT-related industries.
- Researches policies on telecommunications, the internet, broadcasting, and radio waves.
- Studies fair competition and regulation in the ICT market.
- Plans, investigates, evaluates, and analyzes statistics related to ICT and broadcasting.
- Conducts research on international cooperation to establish the foundation for ICT, broadcasting, and the intelligent information society.
- Explores efficiency improvements in ICT-related industries and postal services.
